Laurel Films is an independent Beijing-based production company, operated by producer and screenwriter Fang Li. The company has produced several independent films from directors such Wang Chao, Li Yu and Lou Ye.

The company was founded in 2000 by Fang Li, as an outgrowth of his earth sciences technological company Laurel Industrial Company, Inc.

Controversies 
Both Lost in Beijing and Summer Palace were banned from domestic distribution. With Summer Palace, Lou Ye and producer Nai An were banned from making films for five years by Chinese authorities.

With the banning of Lost, on the other hand, the company and Fang were also faulted for distributing illegal and "pornographic" film clips on the Internet. Fang has claimed that these clips were derived from unlicensed copies, and that neither he nor the company can be faulted for their release online.

Productions 
 The Orphan of Anyang (2001, Wang Chao)
 Day and Night (2004, Wang Chao)
 Dam Street (2005, Li Yu)
 Summer Palace (2006, Lou Ye)
 Lost in Beijing (2007, Li Yu)
 Buddha Mountain (2010, Li Yu)
 Double Xposure (2012, Li Yu)
 The Continent (2014, Han Han)
 Ever Since We Love (2015, Li Yu)

References

External links 
 Laurel Films (cn) from the Internet Movie Database

Film production companies of China
2000 establishments in China
Companies based in Beijing